Basketball Times was an American basketball magazine that was in circulation from 1978 to 2021, and was published by Akers Ink LLC. Basketball Times published monthly and mainly focused on college basketball. The headquarters was in Matthews, North Carolina. The magazine ceased publication with the May 2021 issue.

History 
Basketball Times was launched in October 1978, created by Jay Myers and financed by Edward Bomze. The magazine began as a weekly, during basketball season, that catered to the NBA as much as it did the college game. Basketball Times lasted about two years under Myers and Bomze. Larry Donald purchased Basketball Times in 1980.

While running Basketball Times, Donald was cited 19 times by the United States Basketball Writers Association in its annual writing contest. In 1998, he was presented the Curt Gowdy Award by the Basketball Hall of Fame for service to the sport over his career.

After Donald died of an apparent heart attack in November 2000, his wife Nanci continued to run Basketball Times. John Akers, the managing editor of BT from 2001–11, became publisher of Basketball Times in September 2011. Akers has won 22 USBWA writing awards.

Magazine features 
‘Under the Radar’ -- Done annually for the past five seasons, every projected Division I starter is run through an efficiency rating known as the "Larry Bird formula" - a plus/minus system of positive and negative statistics - and takes note of those players who jump out unexpectedly. They then run those players through another filter - testing their efficiency again, but against better teams - before making final decisions.

Basketball Times Players of the Year:
 2021 - Luka Garza, Iowa
 2020 - Luka Garza, Iowa
 2019 - Zion Williamson, Duke
 2018 - Marvin Bagley, Duke
 2017 - Caleb Swanigan, Purdue
 2016 - Denzel Valentine, Michigan State
 2015 - Frank Kaminsky, Wisconsin
 2014 - Doug McDermott, Creighton
 2013 - Otto Porter, Georgetown
 2012 - Anthony Davis, Kentucky
 2011 - Jimmer Fredette, BYU
 2010 - Evan Turner, Ohio State
 2009 - Blake Griffin, Oklahoma
 2008 - Tyler Hansbrough, North Carolina
 2007 - Kevin Durant, Texas
 2006 - Adam Morrison, Gonzaga, JJ Redick, Duke
 2005 - Andrew Bogut, Utah
 2004 - Jameer Nelson, Saint Joseph’s
 2003 - David West, Xavier
 2002 - Jason Williams, Duke
 2001 - Shane Battier, Duke
 2000 - Kenyon Martin, Cincinnati
 1999 - Jason Terry, Arizona
 1998 - Antawn Jamison, North Carolina
 1997 - Tim Duncan, Wake Forest
 1996 - Marcus Camby, Massachusetts
 1995 - Ed O'Bannon, UCLA
 1994 - Glenn Robinson, Purdue
 1993 - Jamal Mashburn, Kentucky
 1992 - Christian Laettner, Duke
 1991 - Larry Johnson, UNLV
 1990 - Derrick Coleman, Syracuse
 1989 - Sean Elliott, Arizona
 1988 - Hersey Hawkins, Bradley
 1987 - Kenny Smith, North Carolina
 1986 - Scott Skiles, Michigan State
 1985 - Patrick Ewing, Georgetown
 1984 - Akeem Olajuwon, Houston
 1983 - Ralph Sampson, Virginia
 1982 - Ralph Sampson, Virginia

Basketball Times Coaches of the Year:
 2021 - Mark Few, Gonzaga
 2020 - Anthony Grant, Dayton
 2019 - Chris Beard, Texas Tech
 2018 - Tony Bennett, Virginia
 2017 - Scott Drew, Baylor
 2016 - Chris Mack, Xavier
 2015 - John Calipari, Kentucky
 2014 - Gregg Marshall, Wichita State
 2013 - Frank Haith, Missouri
 2012 - Steve Prohm, Murray State
 2011 - Mike Brey, Notre Dame
 2010 - Jim Boeheim, Syracuse
 2009 - Leonard Hamilton, Florida State
 2008 - Keno Davis, Drake
 2007 - Tony Bennett, Washington State
 2006 - Bruce Pearl, Tennessee
 2005 - Bruce Weber, Illinois
 2004 - Mike Montgomery, Stanford
 2003 - Tubby Smith, Kentucky
 2002 - Bob Knight, Texas Tech
 2001 - Al Skinner, Boston College
 2000 - Mike Montgomery, Stanford
 1999 - Tom Izzo, Michigan State
 1998 - Bob Huggins, Cincinnati
 1997 - Mike Krzyzewski, Duke
 1996 - John Calipari, Massachusetts
 1995 - Eddie Sutton, Oklahoma State
 1994 - Norm Stewart, Missouri
 1993 - Dean Smith, North Carolina
 1992 - Steve Fisher, Michigan
 1991 - Rick Majerus, Utah
 1990 - Rick Pitino, Kentucky
 1989 - Bob Knight, Indiana
 1988 - Lute Olson, Arizona
 1987 - Wimp Sanderson, Alabama
 1986 - Mike Krzyzewski, Duke
 1985 - Bobby Cremins, Georgia Tech
 1984 - Jerry Tarkanian, UNLV
 1983 - Lou Carnesecca, St. John’s
 1982 - Gale Catlett, West Virginia

Writers and Editors 
Editors and Contributors for Basketball Times have included:
 Larry Donald (founder)
 John Akers (publisher)
 Dick “Hoops” Weiss
 Bob Ryan
 Rick Bozich
 Wendy Parker
 Dick Vitale
 Mike Sheridan
 Dan Wetzel
 J.R. VanHoose

References

External links 
 

Monthly magazines published in the United States
Sports magazines published in the United States
Basketball magazines
College basketball mass media in the United States
Magazines established in 1978
Magazines disestablished in 2021
Magazines published in North Carolina